Guillaume Gamelin Gaucher (August 16, 1810 – September 16, 1885) was a Quebecois businessman and political figure. He represented Jacques-Cartier in the 1st Canadian Parliament as a Conservative member.

He was born Jean-Guillaume Gaucher in Sault-Saint-Louis (later (Kahnawake) in 1810 and was educated there. He became a merchant at Sainte-Geneviève on the Island of Montreal. Gaucher served as a lieutenant-colonel in the local militia and was also a justice of the peace. He was mayor of the parish of Sainte-Geneviève in 1845 and again from 1859 to 1863 after it became a village. He was elected to the Legislative Assembly of the Province of Canada for Jacques-Cartier in an 1864 by-election; he was elected again after Confederation.

He died at Sainte-Geneviève in 1885.

References

 

1810 births
1885 deaths
Members of the Legislative Assembly of the Province of Canada from Canada East
Conservative Party of Canada (1867–1942) MPs
Members of the House of Commons of Canada from Quebec
Mayors of places in Quebec
Canadian justices of the peace